Nanhua District is a rural district of about 8,209 residents in Tainan, Taiwan. It has two reservoirs, the larger one being the Nanhua Reservoir. It is the largest district in the city.

History
After the handover of Taiwan from Japan to the Republic of China in 1945, Nanhua was organized as a rural township of Tainan County. On 25 December 2010, when Tainan County merged with Tainan City, Nanhua became a district of Tainan City.

Administrative divisions 

The district consists of Nanhua, Xiaolun, Zongken, Beiping, Donghe, Xipu, Beiliao, Yushan and Guanshan Village.

Tourist attractions 
 Baoguang Temple
 Houde Zizhu Temple
 Longhu Temple
 Nanhua Dam
 Nanhua Ecological Park
 Wushan Macaque Preservation Area

References

External links 

  

Districts of Tainan